East Branch Sugar Creek is a  long 3rd order tributary to Sugar Creek in Venango County, Pennsylvania.

Course
East Branch Sugar Creek rises on the Twomile Run divide about 0.25 miles east of Dempseytown in Venango County, Pennsylvania.  East Branch Sugar Creek then flows westerly to meet Sugar Creek at Cooperstown, Pennsylvania.

Watershed
East Branch Sugar Creek drains  of area, receives about 44.8 in/year of precipitation, has a topographic wetness index of 451.28, and has an average water temperature of 7.81 °C.  The watershed is 66% forested.

See also 
 List of rivers of Pennsylvania
 List of tributaries of the Allegheny River

References

Additional Images

Rivers of Venango County, Pennsylvania
Rivers of Pennsylvania
Tributaries of the Allegheny River